Narok North is an electoral constituency in Kenya. It is one of six constituencies of Narok County. The constituency was established for the 1969 elections. Its current Member of Parliament is Hon. Agnes Mantaine Pareyio who also happens to be the first Woman to occupy the much coveted seat.

Members of Parliament 

|}

Locations and wards

References 

Constituencies in Narok County
Constituencies in Rift Valley Province
1969 establishments in Kenya
Constituencies established in 1969